{{DISPLAYTITLE:C15H20O2}}
The molecular formula C15H20O2 (molar mass: 232.32 g/mol) may refer to:

 Costunolide
 Dictyophorine
 Helenin
 Velleral (2,2,8-trimethyl-3,3a,8,8a-tetrahydro-1H-azulene-5,6-dicarbaldehyde)

Molecular formulas